The 1911 Giro di Lombardia was the seventh edition of the Giro di Lombardia cycle race and was held on 5 November 1911. The race started in Milan and finished in Sesto San Giovanni. The race was won by Henri Pélissier.

General classification

References

1911
Giro di Lombardia
Giro di Lombardia